Automolis bicolora is a moth of the family Erebidae. It was described by Francis Walker in 1856. It is found in Lesotho, South Africa and Zimbabwe.

References

Syntomini
Moths described in 1856
Erebid moths of Africa